The seventh season of the CBS police procedural drama series Hawaii Five-0 premiered on Friday September 23, 2016, and concluded on May 12, 2017. The season contained 25 episodes, and the series's 150th episode. For the 2016–17 U.S. television season, the seventh season of Hawaii Five-0 ranked #15 with an average of 12.15 million viewers, and in the 18–49 demographic ranked 43rd with a 1.8/7 Rating/Share.

This season also marks the final appearances of Daniel Dae Kim, Grace Park, and Masi Oka as Chin Ho Kelly, Kono Kalakaua, and Max Bergman respectively.

Cast and characters

Main cast

 Alex O'Loughlin as Lieutenant Commander Steven "Steve" McGarrett, United States Navy Reserve
 Scott Caan as Detective Daniel "Danny" "Danno" Williams, Honolulu Police Department
 Daniel Dae Kim as Lieutenant Chin Ho Kelly, Honolulu Police Department
 Grace Park as Officer Kono Kalakaua, Honolulu Police Department
 Masi Oka as Dr. Max Bergman, Chief Medical Examiner (episodes 1–13)
 Chi McBride as Captain Lou Grover, Honolulu Police Department
 Jorge Garcia as Jerry Ortega

Recurring

Guest stars

Episodes

Production
On March 25, 2016, the series was renewed for a seventh season. On July 6, 2016, production began on the seventh season with a Traditional Hawaiian Blessing.

Masi Oka's departure
On November 17, 2016, it was announced that Oka would be leaving the series after the thirteenth episode.

Reception

Ratings

References

External links
 
 
 List of Hawaii Five-0 episodes at The Futon Critic
 

2016 American television seasons
2017 American television seasons
Hawaii Five-0 (2010 TV series) seasons